Salem is a Dispersed Rural Community and unincorporated place in the municipal township of Cramahe, Northhumberland County in southern Ontario, Canada.

The community gives its name to two nearby geographic features: Salem Creek, which flows past the community to Lake Ontario; and Salem Hill, which rises to the north of the community.

References

Communities in Northumberland County, Ontario